Filmscape Sdn Bhd is one of the media and entertainment companies founded in Malaysia in 1994 by Kabir Bhatia. Filmscape has since diversified, and now provides a range of services related to the media and entertainment industry, specializing in both production and distribution capabilities.

Products and services

Films
 2011: Nur Kasih The Movie
 2013: Juvana 
 2013: Sembunyi
 2014: Dollah Superstar
 2014: Gila Baby
 2015: Juvana 2: Terperangkap Dalam Kebebasan
 2016 : Juvana 3

Drama
 2007: Manjalara (TV3)
 2007: Hikayat Putera Shazlan (Astro Ceria)
 2007: Incredible Tales (MadiaCorp Singapore)
 2008: Frontpage (ntv7)
 2008: Kekasihku Seru (TV3)
 2008: Sutera Maya (TV3)
 2008: Hartamas (ntv7)
 2009: Jalan Merdeka (Astro Warna)
 2009: Tower 13 (TV3)
 2009: Nur Kasih (TV3)
 2010: Tudung Ekspress (Astro Prima)
 2010: Penunggu Gunung Raya (TV3)
 2010: Akinabalu (Astro Citra)
 2010: Habil & Qabil (TV3)
 2010: Tiramisu (TV3)
 2011: Gemilang (TV3)
 2011: Juvana (TV3)
 2011: Supermak (TV3)
 2011: Wasiat (Astro Prima)
 2011: Soffiya (TV3)
 2012: Waris (TV3) - Sequel to Kekasihku Seru
 2012: Bukan Bidadari (TV3)
 2012: Hanya Padamu (TV3)
 2013: Tanah Merah (ntv7)
 2013: Cinta Jangan Pergi (TV9)
 2013: Ummi (TV3)
 2013: Puteri Malam (TV9)
 2014: Jiwa (TV3)
 2014: Antidot (TV3)
 2015: Delina (TV3)
 2015: Puteri Bukan Nama Sebenar (TV3)
 2015: Keluarga Pontimau (TV3)
 2015: Stella (TV9)
 2015: Maria Terindah (Hypp Sensasi)
 2016: Jom Kahwin (Hypp Sensasi)

Telemovie
 2010: Keabadian Cinta (Astro Citra)
 2011: 7 Lagu (Astro Citra)
 2011: Di Telapak Kaki Bonda (TV3)
 2011: Semangat Merdeka (Astro Prima)
 2011: Aduh Sayang (TV3)
 2012: Alamak 7 Hari Lagi (TV3)
 2013: Dari Ibu (TV3)

References

 
Mass media companies established in 1994
1994 establishments in Malaysia
Entertainment companies of Malaysia
Film production companies of Malaysia
Privately held companies of Malaysia